Telegrass is a cannabis distribution network in Israel with over 200,000 members, that uses the encrypted messaging application Telegram.
The network enables anonymous cannabis delivery and an option to rate the product and the vendors.

It is estimated that the revenues of Telegrass are 60 million NIS monthly. According to Haaretz, there are more than 70,000 Telegrass users and over 1,300 dealers, and the numbers are constantly increasing. According to Times of Israel, there are over 100,000 registered users.
The usage of the application in this manner was founded by Amos Silver, a 33-year-old Israeli activist.

In March 2019, Israeli and Ukrainian police arrested the leaders of Telegrass, including the CEO. Silver was extradited to Israel in August 2019.

References

External links 
 Etti Abramov, ‘Telegrass steps in where the state fails’, Ynetnews, March 13, 2019
 Miriam Kresh, It Rained Cannabis In Tel Aviv Today Green Prophet September 3, 2020

Cannabis trafficking
Cannabis in Israel